Waterloo Bridge is an early cast iron bridge, spanning the River Conwy at Betws-y-Coed, in Conwy county borough, north-west Wales.

The bridge is located about half a mile south-east of the village. It was built by the civil engineer Thomas Telford. An inscription on the arch records that it was constructed in the year of the Battle of Waterloo, but although designed and constructed in 1815, its erection was not completed until the following year. It was raised as part of building the road from London to Holyhead (now the A5). The bridge is made wholly from cast iron, apart from the stone bastions, and was only the seventh such bridge to be built.

In 1923, the bridge's masonry abutments were refurbished, and its superstructure was strengthened by encasing the inner three ribs in concrete. A  reinforced cantilevered concrete deck was also added, which provided extra space for new footways; the cast iron parapet railings were re-erected on the outside of the new footways.

In 1978, a new  reinforced concrete deck was added and the masonry abutments were also strengthened.

In May 1996, the bridge was Grade I listed as "a highly important and imaginatively-designed iron road bridge by Thomas Telford, engineer, a significant example of early iron technology".

See also
 List of bridges in Wales

References

 Quartermaine et al. (2003) Thomas Telford's Holyhead Road: The A5 in North Wales, Council for British Archaeology

External links

 

Betws-y-Coed
Bro Garmon
Bridges in Conwy County Borough
Road bridges in Wales
Bridges completed in 1815
Cast-iron arch bridges in Wales
Grade I listed bridges in Wales
Bridges by Thomas Telford
Grade I listed buildings in Conwy County Borough